Karbasdeh (also Romanized as Karbāsdeh; also known as Garbāsdeh and Garbazde) is a village in Luleman Rural District, Kuchesfahan District, Rasht County, Gilan Province, Iran. At the 2006 census, its population was 1,203, in 328 families.

References 

Populated places in Rasht County